The 1920 season was the Decatur Staleys 2nd season of existence, the first professional season of the franchise that would go on to be known as the Chicago Bears and their first under head coach George Halas, competing in the newly formed American Professional Football Association. 

The team improved on their 6–1 record from 1919 to a 10–1–2 record and earning them a second-place finish in the league standings. In the last league game of the season, the Staleys needed a win versus Akron to have a chance at the title. Akron, predictably, played for a tie, achieved that, and won the first APFA title.

The stars of the Staleys were Ed "Dutch" Sternaman, Jimmy Conzelman, and George Halas. Sternaman had a remarkable season with 11 rushing TDs, 1 receiving TDs, 4 field goals, and 3 PATs, totaling 87 points scored out of the Staleys' total of 164. Jimmy Conzelman ran for two scores and threw two more. Halas led the team in receiving scores with 2.

Offseason 
The Decatur Staleys finished 6–1 in their 1919 season as an independent team. Their 1919 owner, George Chamberlain, asked George Halas to help manage the team, and Halas accepted. After the 1919 season, representatives of four Ohio League teams—the Canton Bulldogs, the Cleveland Tigers, the Dayton Triangles, and the Akron Pros—called a meeting on August 20, 1920, to discuss the formation of a new league. At the meeting, they tentatively agreed on a salary cap and pledged not to sign college players or players already under contract with other teams. They also agreed on a name for the circuit: the American Professional Football Association. They then invited other professional teams to a second meeting on September 17.

At that meeting, held at Bulldogs owner Ralph Hay's Hupmobile showroom in Canton, representatives of the Rock Island Independents, the Muncie Flyers, the Decatur Staleys, the Racine Cardinals, the Massillon Tigers, the Chicago Cardinals, and the Hammond Pros agreed to join the league. Representatives of the Buffalo All-Americans and Rochester Jeffersons could not attend the meeting, but sent letters to Hay asking to be included in the league. Team representatives changed the league's name slightly to the American Professional Football Association and elected officers, installing Jim Thorpe as president. Under the new league structure, teams created their schedules dynamically as the season progressed, so there were no minimum or maximum number of games needed to be played. Also, representatives of each team voted to determine the winner of the APFA trophy.

Schedule 
If a team has a dagger, then that team in a non-APFA team. For the attendance, if a cell is greyed out and has "N/A", then that means there is an unknown figure for that game. The green-colored cells indicates a win; the yellow-colored cells indicates a tie; and the red-colored cells indicate a loss.

Game summaries

Week 4: at Rock Island Independents 

October 17, 1920, at Douglas Park

After two games against non-APFA teams, the Staleys played against the APFA Rock Island Independents.

Week 7: at Rock Island Independents 

November 7, 1920, at Douglas Park

On a five-game winning streak, the Staleys played against the Independents again. The game ended in a 0–0 tie. Several injuries occurred throughout the game for the Independents. Sid Nichols, Fred Chicken, and Oke Smith injured their knees on different plays. Harry Gunderson was hit late by George Trafton and the former had to get thirteen stitches on his face, and his hand was broken.

Week 8: at Minneapolis Marines 

November 14, 1920, at Nicollet Park

To conclude their six-game road game streak, the Staleys played against the Minneapolis Marines. The Marines were a non-APFA team but joined the league in 1921. The only score of the game was a 25-yard field goal from Sternaman.

Week 12: vs. Akron Pros 

December 12, 1920, at Cubs Park

The Staleys ended their season in week 12 against the Akron Pros. Prior to the game, Halas moved their home field to the much larger Cubs Park in Chicago and hired Paddy Driscoll from the Cardinals to play on his team in order to help defeat the Pros, which was against league rules at the time. Twelve thousand fans, which was the largest recorded crowd of the season, showed up to watch the game. Of the crowd, about 2,000 were from Pollard's hometown. The Pros almost scored twice, but failed once because of ineligible receiver penalties. On the other side, Fritz Pollard stopped a Staleys' touchdown against Sternment in the third quarter. On the same drive, the Staleys missed a 30-yard field goal. Chamberlin attempted to injure Pollard twice in an attempt to remove him from the game. The final score ended in a 0–0 tie; however, the Chicago Defender reported that the refereeing was biased towards Decatur.

Post-season exhibition game: at Chicago Logan Square A.C. 
At the start of 1921 Halas organized an indoor football game on January 15 in Chicago’s Dexter Park Pavilion, a practice that was a semi-regular event among the local Chicago teams. The Bears played against a local team called Chicago Logan Square A.C. to a 0-0 tie.

The Staley monthly journal would state in the February 1921 issue that "the 'Western Champions' Played One Game of Indoor Football and Decided That Once Was Enough for Them."

Standings

Post season
Since there were no playoff system in the APFA until 1932, a meeting was held to determine the champions. Each team that showed up had a vote to determine the champions. The Staleys and the All-Americans each stated they should be the champions because they had more wins and were not beaten by the Akron Pros. However, since the Akron Pros had a 1.000 winning percentage, the Pros were awarded the Brunswick-Balke Collender Cup on April 30, 1921. Seven players from the Staleys were on the 1920 All-Pro team. Guy Chamberlain, Hugh Blacklock, and George Trafton were on the first team; George Halas was on the second team; and Burt Ingwerson, Ross Petty, and Ed Sternaman were on the third team.

Legacy 
Five players from the 1920 Decatur Staleys roster went on to be enshrined in the Pro Football Hall of Fame. Guy Chamberlin was in the class of 1965, Jimmy Conzelman was in the class of 1964, Paddy Driscoll was in the class of 1965, George Halas was in the class of 1963, and George Trafton was in the class of 1964. The Pro Football Hall of Fame's selection committee compiled a list of the National Football League 1920s All-Decade Team. Each of the aforementioned Hall-of-Famers are on this team.

Notes

References

External links 
 1920 Decatur Staleys at Pro-Football-Reference.com

Decatur Staleys
Chicago Bears seasons
Chicago Bears